Eskimo ice cream may refer to:

 Alaskan ice cream (akutaq), a traditional food of Alaskan Eskimo, Yupik, Aleut

 Eskimo (ice cream), a chain of ice cream parlours in Nicaragua
 Eskimo pie, a brand of chocolate-covered vanilla ice cream bar

See also
 Indian ice cream (disambiguation)
 Ice cream (disambiguation)
 Eskimo (disambiguation)